The Brazil women's national rugby union team are the national side of Brazil, representing them at rugby union. After several successful performances at Sevens rugby, they played their first 15-a-side fixture in May 2008 against Netherlands and lost 10–0.

History
The first women's rugby match known in Brazil took place in 1987, during São Paulo Athletic Club's traditional end-of-year sevens tournament. Most of the players were the girlfriends and sisters of the men's team players, who always accompanied them to games and practices. In 1997, during Women's Day, another match took place in Florianópolis, in Desterro Rugby Clube. Maria Mikaella, former captain of Brazilian National Team, played that match made a little statement about how it was"we didn't know the sport. In Brazil we didn't have rugby on TV or even a rugby ball to buy. We haven't heard about rugby until our friends began to play. We started just watching, but the sport seemed to be really cool to just watch. So we convinced the boys to teach us. The first game was messy. I just remember that we lost. However made us fall in love with rugby."Brazil played their first international test match against the Netherlands in 2008. The team wasn't formed again until 2019, when Brazil visited Colombia for its first match against South American opposition. In 2020, Brazil and Colombia played again in Medellín, in a match that was the first one in a Women's Rugby World Cup qualifiers. Colombia defeated Brazil by 23-19.

2023 will see Brazil face Colombia in official test matches, which is part of the South American region’s qualifying matches for the 2025 Rugby World Cup.

Players 
Squad for November test against Colombia:

Results summary
 (Full internationals only)

Full internationals

See also
 Rugby union in Brazil
 Associação Brasileira de Rugby

References

External links
  Confederação Brasileira de Rugby - Official Site
 Brazil  on Rugbydata.com
 RugbySpirit.com.br Brazilian look at Rugby News (Portuguese)

Women's national rugby union teams
Rugby union in Brazil
R
Brazil national rugby union team